He Jintao (died 840) was a general of the Chinese dynasty Tang Dynasty, who, as military governor (Jiedushi) of Weibo Circuit (魏博, headquartered in modern Handan, Hebei), ruled the circuit in de facto independence from the imperial government.

Background 
It is not known when He Jintao was born, but it is known that his family was originally from Ling Prefecture (靈州, in modern Yinchuan, Ningxia).  His great-grandfather He Xiaowu and grandfather He Jun both served as officers at Ling Prefecture.  His father He Mo served as an officer at Xia Prefecture (夏州, in modern Yulin, Shaanxi).

Early career 
Eventually, He Jintao settled in Weibo's capital Wei Prefecture, and came to serve in the Weibo army, under the then-military governor Tian Hongzheng, who was obedient to the imperial government.  In a campaign that Tian waged against Wang Chengzong, the military governor of Chengde Circuit (成德, headquartered in modern Shijiazhuang, Hebei), when Wang was resisting the imperial government, there was a night when Weibo forces conducted a night raid against Chengde's capital Heng Prefecture.  Wang responded by sending an officer in an iron mask, commanding 1,000 cavalry soldiers, to counterattack against the Weibo forces.  He Jintao engaged the Chengde cavalry soldiers and defeated them, almost capturing the officer in the iron mask, causing much apprehension among the Chengde soldiers.  After a subsequent campaign that Tian conducted against Li Shidao the military governor of Pinglu Circuit (平盧, headquartered in modern Tai'an, Shandong), in which He Jintao made contributions, He Jintao was given the honorary imperial censor title of Shiyushi.

Seizure of Weibo Circuit and service as military governor 
By 829, He Jintao was serving under Shi Xiancheng, who was ruling Weibo in de facto independence from the imperial government.  However, at that time, imperial forces were close to defeating the rebel general Li Tongjie, who controlled the neighboring Henghai Circuit (橫海, headquartered in modern Cangzhou, Hebei), and Shi became apprehensive.  Under the advice of his son Shi Xiaozhang, Shi Xiancheng offered to surrender control of Weibo to the imperial government and requested another command elsewhere.  The reigning Emperor Wenzong reacted by commissioning Shi Xiancheng as the military governor of Hezhong Circuit (河中, headquartered in modern Yuncheng, Shanxi), and Li Ting the military governor of Yicheng Circuit (義成, headquartered in modern Anyang, Henan) as the military governor of Weibo.  He also carved out three of Weibo's six prefectures — Xiang (相州, in modern Anyang), Wei (衛州, in modern Xinxiang, Henan, note different characters than the capital of Weibo), and Chan (澶州, in modern Anyang) — to create a new circuit, for Shi Xiaozhang to serve as military governor of.

Thereafter, Shi Xiancheng prepared to depart Wei Prefecture.  It was said that he stripped the headquarters and circuit treasury of its treasures, ready to take them to Hezhong, and this angered the soldiers.  The soldiers mutinied and killed Shi Xiancheng, and they supported He Jintao to be their leader.  When Li Ting subsequently arrived at Wei Prefecture, He Jintao refused to let him enter, and subsequently made a surprise attack, defeating him.  At that time, the imperial treasury was drained, and the imperial government, judging that it could not defeat He Jintao, capitulated and made He Jintao the military governor of Weibo, and further returned Xiang, Wei, and Chan prefectures to Weibo.

It was said that as the military governor of Weibo, He Jintao was favored by his people.  He died in 840, and the reigning Emperor Wuzong (Emperor Wenzong's younger brother) allowed his son He Chongshun to inherit the circuit.

Notes and references 

 Old Book of Tang, vol. 181.
 New Book of Tang, vol. 210.
 Zizhi Tongjian, vols. 244, 246.

840 deaths
Tang dynasty jiedushi of Weibo Circuit
Year of birth unknown